Ceniceros is a Spanish toponymic surname derived from the word ceniza, meaning ash, and the city of . Notable people with the name include:

 Guillermo Ceniceros (born 1939), Mexican painter
  (1900–1979), Mexican politician and diplomat
 José Ignacio Ceniceros (born 1956), Spanish politician
 Lizzi Ceniceros (born 1973), Mexican pianist and orchestra director
 Martín García Ceniceros (fl. 1632), Roman Catholic prelate and inquisitor
  (1880–1937), Mexican revolutionary

See also 
 Ceniceros government, the regional government of La Rioja, led by José Ignacio Ceniceros from 2015 to 2019
 Cenicero, a municipality in La Rioja, Spain
 CD Cenicero, a football club

References 

Spanish-language surnames
Toponymic surnames